Wanstead was launched in 1802. In 1807 a French privateer captured her, but the British Royal Navy recaptured her the next day. Then in 1810 she was again captured by a French privateer, and was again recaptured a few days later. In 1819 she traded with India or China under a license from the British East India Company (EIC). She was wrecked in 1820.

Career
Thomas Wilson received a letter of marque for Wanstead on 1 October 1805. In 1807 her trade was London-Madeira.

On 25 April 1807 Wanstead, Wilson, master, was sailing from London and Madeira to Barbados and Jamaica. She encountered the French privateer Lady Villaret, of six guns and 117 men. In the 4-hour single-ship action that ensued, Wanstead had one man killed and five wounded before she struck. Lady Villaret had 15 men killed and wounded. The next day Admiral Alexander Cochrane's squadron recaptured Wanstead and took her into Barbados.

William Coultons received a letter of marque on 14 April 1808.

On 26 March 1810 Wanstead, Morton, master, was sailing from Jamaica to London when the French privateer Grand Decidé, of 18 guns and 200 men, captured her.  and the British privateer Sorcière  recaptured Wanstead on 3 April 1810.

In 1818, Wanstead, W. Young, master, was shown with trade London-India. She sailed to Bengal on 20 January. On 28 October 1818 Wanstead, Young, master, was in Madras Roads when a gale drove her and a number of other vessels out.

The entry in Lloyd's Register for 1819 saw her master changing to Richards, and her trade changing to London-St Vincent.

Fate
Wanstead, Smith, master, was wrecked on 11 July 1820 at Irvin's Bay, Grenada, after her cables parted during a storm. Her crew and part of her cargo were saved.

Notes, citations and references
Notes

Citations

References

 

1802 ships
Captured ships
Maritime incidents in July 1820
Age of Sail merchant ships
Merchant ships of the United Kingdom